Ira Sherwin Haseltine (July 13, 1821 – January 13, 1899) was a Greenback Representative representing Missouri's 6th congressional district from March 4, 1881 – March 3, 1883.

Haseltine was born in Andover, Vermont in Windsor County, Vermont.  He moved to Richland Center, Wisconsin in 1842.  He taught school in Natchez, Mississippi and was admitted to the bar in 1842 where he practiced in Richland Center.  He was delegate to the Republican National Convention in 1860 and a member of the Wisconsin State Assembly from 1867 to 1869. He moved to a farm near Springfield, Missouri in 1870 and was elected to Congress in 1880 but lost re-election in 1882.  He is buried in Hazelwood Cemetery in Springfield.

References

 

1821 births
1899 deaths
People from Windsor County, Vermont
Greenback Party members of the United States House of Representatives from Missouri
Missouri Greenbacks
Members of the Wisconsin State Assembly
People from Greene County, Missouri
People from Richland Center, Wisconsin
Burials in Missouri
19th-century American politicians
Politicians from Springfield, Missouri
Members of the United States House of Representatives from Missouri